Next Up may refer to:

"Next Up", song by Rob Swift from Back to the Beat (Rob Swift album)
"Next Up", song by Sunz of Man from The Old Testament (album)
"Next Up", song by hip hop duo UGK from Underground Kingz
"Next Up", song by Lil Yachty from Nuthin' 2 Prove